Grandview Park Baptist School was a school located on the east side of Des Moines, Iowa, in the United States which offered a traditional style of education. It was a private school serving the community and affiliated with the adjacent Grandview Park Baptist Church on the east side of Des Moines. The school began classes in 1972 with 78 students in grades K-6.  The school quickly grew to over 530 students in grades K-12. Bible courses were taught at every level of the school and a Biblical world view was instructed throughout each subject & course. The school also had a noted drama program which produced quality plays and presentations each year open to the public.

Sports
The school's team name was the Grandview Defenders and the school's football program made it to the state playoffs twice in its first six years. Grades 7-12 were offered basketball, football, varsity soccer, and volleyball, the latter of which repeatedly went to the state tournament and were the 2002 Class 1A State Champions.. The school was a member of the Bluegrass Conference. Two Defender athletes were honored from the teams as 1A Players of the Year.

Closure
The school ceased operations following the 2013 - 2014 school year due largely to the church and school separation and school faculty transferring en masse to Grand View Christian School which was opened the following term by former faculty of Grandview Park Baptist School.

References

External links
 Parent Church - Grandview Park Baptist Church

Christian schools in Iowa
Defunct Christian schools in the United States
Private elementary schools in Iowa
Private middle schools in Iowa
Private high schools in Iowa
Schools in Des Moines, Iowa
Iowa High School Athletic Association
1972 establishments in Iowa